The Evergreen Corner Rural Historic District in Haxtun, Colorado, is a  farm property, a historic district that was listed on the National Register of Historic Places in 2013.

History 
Swedish immigrant Gustav Lindholm homesteaded the property in March 1887 but died in July 1887. Henry A. Flaker, of Nebraska, bought the land in 1917 and built a barn, a house, and a tankhouse, and planted evergreens to shelter it, naming it Evergreen Corner. Flaker's farm produced winter wheat and hogs. Lawrence Heermann bought the farm in 1946 and farmed wheat and beef cattle.

According to the NRHP nomination, the district "is an excellent example of a Phillips County farmstead; a working landscape that illustrates the development of agriculture from the 1910s through the 1960s."

As of 2013, the district included four contributing buildings, 11 contributing structures, one contributing site, and two contributing objects, as well as eight non-contributing resources.

References

Historic districts on the National Register of Historic Places in Colorado
Phillips County, Colorado
Farms in Colorado